Anna Sutherland Bissell (1846–1934) was a Canadian-American businesswoman who was the first woman CEO in the United States as the executive board member of the Bissell Corporation, known for its carpet sweepers and vacuum cleaners.

Early life 
On December 2, 1846, Bissell was born in River John, Nova Scotia. Bissell's father was William Sutherland (1811-1907), a sea captain. Bissell's mother was Eleanor (nee Putnam) Sutherland (1817-1853).

At an early age, her family moved to De Pere, Wisconsin, where they settled.

Career 
By age 16, Bissell was a school teacher.

After Bissell married Melville R. Bissell at 19, they became a joint partner in their crockery and china business. The Bissell Sweeper website recounts that Mrs. Bissell complained to her husband about sawdust that collected in their carpets and was difficult to remove, whereupon he made great improvements to a new invention called the carpet sweeper. When Bissell's husband invented the Bissell carpet sweeper in 1876, Bissell became a salesperson traveling from town to town selling the sweeper. Bissell was the number one salesperson.

Executive 
After her husband's death in 1889 and with one child and five grandchildren, Bissell took over the business and became the chief executive officer of the Bissell company.

Bissell established new guidelines on trademarks and patents and moved Bissell carpet sweepers into the international market. By 1899 she had created the largest organization of its kind in the world. 

In 1919, Bissell also became the chairman of the Bissell company. As president of the corporation and chairman of the board, Bissell introduced progressive labor policies including workman's compensation and pension plans long before these practices were widespread in industry.

It was said of her that she "studied business the way other women of her time studied French." She kept pace with the growing complexities of industrialism and knew every facet of the Bissell production.

Philanthropist 
Bissell was a charter member of the Ladies Literary Club, a life member of the Women's City Club, and an active member of Zonta. She served on the board of The Clark Memorial Home and was for years the sole woman member of the National Hardware Men's Association.

Bissell was a generous philanthropist. She was the first woman trustee of the Methodist Episcopal Church and was actively involved in Bissell House, a recreation and training program for Grand Rapids, Michigan youth and immigrant women. She also served on the board of what was to become Blodgett Home for Children.

Personal life 
Bissell's husband was Melville Reuben Bissell. They had five children, Anna Dotelle Bissell (b. 1868), Lillie May Bissell (b. 1871), Melville Reuben Bissell (b. 1882), Harvey Bissell (1885), and Irving Joy Bissell (b. 1888). In 1889, Bissell's husband died from pneumonia.

On November 8, 1934, Bissell died in Grand Rapids, Michigan. Bissell is buried in Oakhill Cemetery in Grand Rapids, Michigan.

Legacy 
In July 2016 a seven-foot (2.1 m) statue of Bissell was unveiled; it is located outside the DeVos Place Grand Gallery in Grand Rapids, Michigan. The bronze statue with "Anna Bissell (1846-1934)" was designed by Ann Hirsch. It was funded by the Peter Secchia family.

Bissell's home known as the Bissell House in Grand Rapids, Michigan, no longer exists, however, its site is now occupied by NBC television affiliate station WOOD-TV.

See also 
 DeVos Place Convention Center
 Heritage Hill Historic District (Grand Rapids, Michigan)

References

External links 
 (with image)
 Michigan Women's Hall of Fame - Anna Sutherland Bissell - PDF format download.
 Image of the Anna Bissell statue
 Anna Sutherland Bissell, Greater Grand Rapids History Council
 Recollections of Anna Bissell McCay: with historical data from archive.org - full Bissell family genealogy in text format.
 1923 passport photo Anna Bissell(courtesy flickr.com)
 Day221: The Bissell House ... - this house in South Pasadena, California is the former home of Bissell's daughter Anna Bissell McCay and son-in-law William Southerland McCay.

1846 births
1934 deaths
American manufacturing businesspeople
American philanthropists
Canadian expatriates in the United States
Canadian people of Scottish descent
Businesspeople from Grand Rapids, Michigan
People from Pictou County
19th-century American businesspeople
19th-century American businesswomen